William Allen Chipley (July 2, 1920 – December 27, 2002) was an American football player and coach.  He played professionally for three seasons in the National Football League (NFL) with the Boston Yanks/New York Bulldogs. He was drafted by the Boston Yanks in the eighth round of the 1947 NFL Draft. He first enrolled at Clemson University before transferring to Washington and Lee University. Chipley attended E. C. Glass High School in Lynchburg, Virginia.  Chipley served as the head football coach at Washington and Lee from 1955 to 1956, compiling a record of 1–14.

Head coaching record

References

External links
 Just Sports Stats

1920 births
2002 deaths
American football defensive backs
American football ends
Boston Yanks players
Jacksonville Naval Air Station Flyers football players
New York Bulldogs players
Washington and Lee Generals football coaches
Washington and Lee Generals football players
Sportspeople from Lynchburg, Virginia
Players of American football from Virginia